The 1964 Cincinnati Reds season consisted of the Reds finishing in a tie for second place in the National League with the Philadelphia Phillies. Both teams finished at 92–70, one game behind the NL and World Series Champion St. Louis Cardinals. The Reds' home games were played at Crosley Field.

The Reds began the season with Fred Hutchinson as manager, but he had to give way to acting manager Dick Sisler in August due to health issues with a record of 60–49. Sisler finished the season, guiding the team to a record of 32–21. After formally resigning as manager in October, Hutchinson died of lung cancer at age 45 on November 12, 1964; he was the first Reds member to have his number retired.

The 1964 season will long be remembered as one of the most exciting in MLB history, as both the National League and the American League saw multiple teams have chances to win the pennant in the last two weeks. The National League had three teams: the Cardinals, the Reds, and the Phillies, within a single game down the stretch, while the fourth-place Giants (3 games) and the fifth-place Braves (5) were within striking distance in the last month. The Phillies had double-digit lead with a month to go, but suffered a major collapse. But Philadelphia regained some momentum late by winning two games from the then first-place Reds including the last game of the year, to open the door for the Cardinals to win the pennant by one game over the Reds and the Phillies.

Reds players wore their last names on their uniform backs; the numbers were moved up and the names were below the numbers.

Regular season

Season standings

Record vs. opponents

Notable transactions 
 August 23, 1964: Jimmie Coker was purchased by the Reds from the Milwaukee Braves for $35,000.

Roster

Player stats

Batting

Starters by position 
Note: Pos = Position; G = Games played; AB = At bats; H = Hits; Avg. = Batting average; HR = Home runs; RBI = Runs batted in

Other batters 
Note: G = Games played; AB = At bats; H = Hits; Avg. = Batting average; HR = Home runs; RBI = Runs batted in

Pitching

Starting pitchers 
Note: G = Games pitched; IP = Innings pitched; W = Wins; L = Losses; ERA = Earned run average; SO = Strikeouts

Other pitchers 
Note: G = Games pitched; IP = Innings pitched; W = Wins; L = Losses; ERA = Earned run average; SO = Strikeouts

Relief pitchers 
Note: G = Games pitched; W = Wins; L = Losses; SV = Saves; ERA = Earned run average; SO = Strikeouts

Awards and honors 
Gold Glove Award
 Johnny Edwards, catcher

All-Stars 
All-Star Game
 Johnny Edwards, reserve
 Leo Cárdenas, reserve

Farm system 

LEAGUE CHAMPIONS: San Diego

References

External links 
1964 Cincinnati Reds season at Baseball Reference

Cincinnati Reds seasons
Cincinnati Reds season
Cincinnati Reds